TOP FC is a Somali football club based in Mogadishu, Somalia. 

The team played in the Somalia League in 2007.

Football clubs in Somalia